DRT may refer to:

 DRT Entertainment, a New York city-based independent record label.
 Daughters of the Republic of Texas
 Decimal reduction time, or D-value, the time required to kill 90% of microorganisms at a certain temperature
 Del Rio International Airport in Del Rio, Texas (IATA code)
 Demand responsive transport, a type of public transport bus service
 Discourse Representation Theory, a theory in semantics
 Doña Remedios Trinidad, Bulacan, a municipality in the Philippines
 Downtown Relief Line, a proposed subway line in Toronto, Ontario
Drag Race Thailand, a Thai spinoff of RuPaul's Drag Race
 Durham Region Transit, a Canadian public transit operator in Durham Region, Ontario